Tower 25 (also called The White Walls) is a high-rise building located in the center of Nicosia, the capital of Cyprus. It was designed by the architect Jean Nouvel and is one of Nicosia's landmarks owing to its original design and location. Standing 62 meters tall, Tower 25 is the eleventh tallest building in Cyprus.

The ground floor, the mezzanine areas and the six floors above them are offices of Ernst & Young (EY). The next seven floors contain apartments overlooking the whole capital. The penthouse occupies two top floors. Its design resembles traditional Cypriot architecture, and contains a swimming pool.

Most of the apartments, including the penthouse, were sold before construction commenced. The building cost approximately 25 million euros and was finished by the beginning of 2013.

Architecture

A full-length balcony on each floor offers views of the historic city and walls, also allowing natural light in the living spaces and offices below. The varying width and depth of balconies on each floor create a natural image as well as the illusion that the building is not static but actually breathing.

The other facades feature a seemingly random pattern of square voids serving as windows as well as openings for natural ventilation needed due to the hot climate of the city. On the south-facing facade, which receives the most sunlight, a series of balconies was created that span the width of the building.

Location
The building's location faces the Venetian fortifications of the city and is next to the new Eleftheria Square redesigned by Zaha Hadid. It is also close to the main retailing avenues of the city, Makariou Avenue and Themistokli Dervi Avenue. The building itself is meant attract more developments on the ring avenue around the walls on which it is located.

See also
Bosco Verticale

References

External links
Information in Construction Company's website
Information in Developer Company's website
Architect's website
article on Tower 25
 

Jean Nouvel buildings
Buildings and structures in Nicosia
Architecture in Cyprus
Skyscrapers in Cyprus
Skyscraper office buildings
Residential skyscrapers